This is a list of airports in Sweden, sorted by location.



Airports 

Airport names shown in bold indicate the airport has scheduled service on commercial airlines. Airport names that are not bold but have an IATA code have previously had scheduled service.

Ten of the most important airports are owned by the national company Swedavia.
The other airports which have scheduled service, are in general owned by the city concerned.

Most air routes inside Sweden are going to and from Stockholm. The shorter connections are mostly used by business travellers, since there is strong competition from rail and road travel. For the longest routes (Stockholm–Umeå and longer) air travel is the main mode of travel also for leisure travellers.

For international travel, Arlanda is the hub for the Stockholm region and places north thereof. For southbound or westbound international travel from places in Sweden well south of Stockholm, Copenhagen is the hub. From Gothenburg, some main airports of Europe can be directly reached and be used as hubs.

Heliports 
Only heliports with ICAO code are listed.

See also 
 Transport in Sweden
 List of airports by ICAO code: E#ES – Sweden
 Wikipedia:WikiProject Aviation/Airline destination lists: Europe#Sweden
 List of the largest airports in the Nordic countries

Notes

References 
 Luftfartsverket (LFV) (Swedish Civil Aviation Authority)
 Integrated Aeronautical Information Package
 AD 2 Aerodromes
 Aeronautical Information Publication (2008)
 
 
 Svenska Flygplatser (Swedish Airports) (flygtorget.se) 
 
  – includes IATA codes

External links 
Lists of airports in Sweden:
Great Circle Mapper
Aircraft Charter World
The Airport Guide
World Aero Data
A–Z World Airports
FallingRain.com

Sweden
 
 
Airports
Airports
Sweden